Rongbuk may refer to:

 Rongbuk Glacier
 Rongbuk Monastery
 Nike Rongbuk, an athletic shoe by Nike, Inc.